Francisco Ramis (born 13 June 1951) is a Puerto Rican former swimmer. He competed in five events at the 1968 Summer Olympics.

References

1951 births
Living people
Puerto Rican male swimmers
Olympic swimmers of Puerto Rico
Swimmers at the 1968 Summer Olympics
Sportspeople from Havana